Alfred Morrison Lay (May 20, 1836 – December 8, 1879) was a U.S. Representative from Missouri.

Born in Lewis County, Missouri, Lay moved with his parents to Benton County in 1842.
He attended private schools and was graduated from Bethany College, Virginia (now in West Virginia), in 1856.
He studied law.
He was admitted to the bar in 1857 and commenced practice in Jefferson City, Missouri.
He was appointed United States district attorney for the western district of Missouri by President Buchanan and served until his resignation in 1861.
Enlisted as a private in the Missouri State Guard and was subsequently promoted to the rank of major.
He returned to Missouri when the command disbanded.
He served as captain of ordnance, Confederate States Army.
He resumed the practice of law in Jefferson City, Missouri.
He served as member of the State constitutional convention in 1875.

Lay was elected as a Democrat to the Forty-sixth Congress and served from March 4, 1879, until his death in Washington, D.C., on December 8, 1879.
He was interred in Woodlawn Cemetery, Jefferson City, Missouri.

See also
List of United States Congress members who died in office (1790–1899)

References

1836 births
1879 deaths
Confederate States Army officers
Democratic Party members of the United States House of Representatives from Missouri
Bethany College (West Virginia) alumni
19th-century American politicians
United States Attorneys for the Western District of Missouri